{{DISPLAYTITLE:C8H4N2}}
The molecular formula C8H4N2 (molar mass: 128.13 g/mol, exact mass: 128.0374 u) may refer to:

 Phthalonitrile, or phthalodinitrile
 Isophthalonitrile
 1,4-Dicyanobenzene

Molecular formulas